Haw Creek Township may refer to the following townships in the United States:

 Haw Creek Township, Bartholomew County, Indiana
 Haw Creek Township, Knox County, Illinois
Haw Creek Township, Morgan County, Missouri